Hormone therapy or hormonal therapy is the use of hormones in medical treatment. Treatment with hormone antagonists may also be referred to as hormonal therapy or antihormone therapy. The most general classes of hormone therapy are oncologic hormone therapy, hormone replacement therapy (for menopause), androgen replacement therapy (ART), oral contraceptive pills, and transgender hormone therapy.

Types 
 Hormone replacement therapy (HRT), also known as menopausal hormone therapy (MHT), is for women with menopausal symptoms. It is based on the idea that the treatment may prevent discomfort caused by diminished circulating estrogen and progesterone hormones, or in the case of the surgically or prematurely menopausal, that it may prolong life and may reduce incidence of dementia. It involves the use of one or more of a group of medications designed to artificially boost hormone levels. The main types of hormones involved are estrogen, progesterone, or progestins, and sometimes, testosterone. It is often referred to as "treatment" rather than therapy.
 Hormone replacement therapy for people with hypogonadism and intersex conditions (e.g., Klinefelter syndrome, Turner syndrome)
 Androgen replacement therapy (ART) in males with low levels of testosterone due to disease or aging. It is a hormone treatment often prescribed to counter the effects of male hypogonadism or who for men who have lost their testicular function to disease, cancer, or other causes. It is sometimes used for late-onset hypogonadism (so-called "andropause"), but the significance of a decrease in testosterone levels is debated and its treatment with replacement is controversial. The Food and Drug Administration (FDA) stated in 2015 that neither the benefits nor the safety of testosterone have been established in older men with low testosterone levels.
 Transgender hormone therapy for transgender people introduces sex steroids associated with the gender that the patient identifies with (notably testosterone for transgender men and estrogen for transgender women). Some intersex and non-binary people may also undergo hormone therapy. Cross-sex hormone treatment for transgender individuals is divided into two main types: feminizing hormone therapy and masculinizing hormone therapy.
 Feminizing hormone therapy in sex reassignment therapy for transgender women
 Masculinizing hormone therapy in sex reassignment therapy for transgender men
 Hormonal therapy for cancer
 Androgen deprivation therapy for men with prostate cancer
 Estrogen deprivation therapy for women with estrogen receptor-positive breast cancer
 High-dose estrogen therapy for women with estrogen receptor-positive breast cancer
 Chemical castration of men or sex offenders with paraphilias or hypersexuality
 Growth hormone therapy for growth hormone deficiency
 Thyroid hormone replacement in hypothyroidism
 Antithyroid therapy in hyperthyroidism
 Glucocorticoid and/or mineralocorticoid replacement in conditions such as Addison's disease
 Antiglucocorticoid therapy in Cushing's syndrome
 Insulin therapy in Type 1 Diabetes
 Oral contraceptive pills for various purposes including birth control
 Menstrual suppression

See also
 Life extension

References

Medical treatments
Obstetrical and gynaecological procedures